London Scottish Football Club is a rugby union club in England. The club is a member of both the Rugby Football Union and the Scottish Rugby Union. The club is currently playing in the RFU Championship. The club share the Athletic Ground with Richmond.

History

Founding (1878)
In early 1878, three Scottish members of a team called St. Andrew's Rovers FC decided to break away to form their own club for Scots. These men, George Grant, Neil Macglashan and Robert Arnot attracted a number of responses to a circular they sent out. The London Scottish Regiment in particular were very warm to the idea. Very soon after, on 10 April 1878, London Scottish FC was founded in The Queen's Head, in Water Lane, Blackfriars, London (universally known as MacKay's Tavern, frequently mis-recorded, as Ned Mackay the jovial Scottish landlord ran the pub), initially played on Blackheath Common, and later at Richmond Athletic Ground in Surrey.

They had a sizable fixture list and played some of the leading clubs of the time immediately, such as Ravenscourt Park Football Club and Queen's House Football Club (the latter being the only London team to have never lost to London Scottish). They also played St Andrew's Rovers that season. St Andrew's, who had lost the core of their best players lost twice to London Scottish and folded at the end of the season. London Scottish had a very successful first season, and having played 15 matches they only lost four (against already well established sides, Flamingoes, Guy's Hospital, Queen's House and Wasps).

In 1914 at the outbreak of the First World War all sixty members of the four London Scottish teams who played in their last matches in April enlisted. Fifteen survived, and one played Rugby again. They are commemorated in Mick Imlah's poem "London Scottish".

Early history

London Scottish was the first of the "Exiles" rugby clubs to be founded, and the last of the main three – after London Irish and London Welsh – to go "open" in 1996.

London Scottish made the John Player Cup Final in 1974, where they lost 26–6 against defending champions Coventry.

The club regularly featured at the Middlesex Sevens tournament, winning the trophy in 1937, 1960, 1961, 1962, 1963, 1965 and 1991. They have won the Melrose Sevens three times, in 1962, 1965 and 2019.

Professional era (1996–2020) 
Scottish turned professional in 1996. Tony Tiarks bought the club for £500,000 in 1996.

In the summer of 1998 Scottish, co-tenants of Richmond at the Athletic Ground, were promoted to the top division via a play-off, and Tiarks forced through an ill-fated groundshare with Harlequins and London Broncos at the Stoop Memorial Ground.

In the 1998–99 season, Scottish made their only appearance in the English Premiership. Under coach John Steele, and despite limited resources, the team finished 12th out of 14 teams, which would have saved them from relegation had they not fallen into administration at the season's end. Notable wins that season included: versus Bath (13–11), Saracens (24–7) and Newcastle Falcons (27–17). That season's squad included Scottish international stars Ronnie Eriksson, Simon Holmes and Derrick Lee, Australians Simon Fenn and Eddie Jones, and the South African Jannie de Beer.

Midway through the 1998–1999 season, Tiarks became disillusioned and discussed selling Scottish's place in the Premiership to second-division Bristol. He bailed out in the summer of 1999. The professional club London Scottish Rugby was placed into administration in 1999 and nominally merged into London Irish (who moved their games to the Stoop) along with Richmond, who were also placed into administration.

The original amateur club rejoined the RFU leagues at the bottom of the pyramid after effectively having been relegated nine divisions by the RFU. The club progressed back up through seven divisions in 10 seasons to RFU Championship for the 2011–12 season.

The club was promoted to the English National leagues (National Division Three South) for the 2007–08 season after an eight-year absence. The club was unbeaten in the 2008–09 season, earning promotion to the revamped RFU National 1 Division for the 2009–10 season. In 2009–10, the club finished second in their first season in RFU National 1 Division.

The club secured promotion to the RFU Championship for the 2011–12 season. During the 2012–13 season, the club made the switch to a full-time professional set-up, with many of the club's part-time professional players leaving and new coaches brought on board, this included former Leicester Tigers hooker James Buckland and France and London Wasps legend Serge Betsen. The fully professional set-up was credited for an impressive performance away to Championship leaders Newcastle Falcons, where three penalties brought them to the brink of a shock win, but they lost 12–9. There followed significant wins in the second half of the season, including a 26–23 victory over Bedford Blues, a 25–13 win over Nottingham and a 20–17 win away at Cornish Pirates. Scottish were still challenging for a place in the top four of the Championship until as late as March, when they were beaten by Leeds Carnegie, and they ended the season in mid-table.

The Scottish again finished mid-table in the Championship in the 2013–14 season. The team had four players named in the Championship Best XV – American international Eric Fry, Tomas Francis, Mark Bright and Championship top try-scorer Miles Mantella.

Following a mediocre 2016–17 campaign, the club appointed Loughborough Students director of rugby Dave Morris as director of rugby and the club saw a change at the top, with Malcom Offord becoming chairman of the club and Carson Russell as CEO.

Semi-professional club (2021–)
Following a reduction in funding from the RFU, Scottish adopted a semi-professional model from the 2020–21 season, with players and coaches being employed part-time. Following this, in February 2021 it was confirmed that due to funding cuts and the costs associated with the COVID-19 pandemic Scottish would not take part in the upcoming season.

Scottish were to leave the Athletic Ground after 127 years, with the first team temporarily relocating to Esher's rugby ground in Hersham and the rest of the club also seeking relocation. However it was later confirmed they would remain at the Athletic Ground for their return to the Championship in the 2021–22 season.

Sevens
London Scottish have been great exponents of rugby sevens, winning the Melrose Sevens three times, Middlesex Sevens seven times and the Rosslyn Park London Floodlit Sevens seven times.

Captains and league position (since 1999–2000)

Head coach and management (since 1999–2000)

Overall league statistics

Honours
London Scottish
Melrose Sevens champions: 1962, 1965, 2019
Hawick Sevens champions: 1965
Kelso Sevens champions: 1991
 Ross Sutherland Sevens champions: 1990
 Glasgow Academicals Sevens champions: 1979, 1989
 Haig Trophy Sevens champions: 1980
 Stirling Sevens champions: 1988
Middlesex Sevens champions: 1937, 1960, 1961, 1962, 1963, 1965, 1991
Courage League Division 3 champions: 1989–90
Courage League National Division 2 champions: 1991–92 
London Division 4 North West champions: 2001–02
London Division 3 North West champions: 2002–03
London Division 2 North champions: 2003–04
London Division 1 champions: 2006–07
National League 3 South champions: 2008–09
National League 1 champions: 2010–11

London Scottish Lions (amateur side)
Herts/Middlesex 2 champions: 2018–19

Current standings

Current squad

The London Scottish squad as announced for the 2022–23 season was:

Current staff
First team
Director of Rugby – Bryan Redpath
Head coach – Joe Gray
Backs Coach – 
Head of Strength and Conditioning - Boris Pineles
Commercial
Chief Operating Officer – Louise Newton

Notable former players

Scotland internationalists

The following former London Scottish players have represented Scotland at full international level. London Scottish have produced more than 220 Scottish international players, more than any other club.

   John Allan
  David Bedell-Sivright
  William Berkley
  Alastair Biggar
  Mike Biggar
  Norman Bruce
  Paul Burnell, their most-capped player, who played 52 matches for Scotland (3 World Cups – 1991, 1995, 1999)
  George Campbell
  Mike Campbell-Lamerton
  Damian Cronin (2 World Cups – 1991, 1995)
  John Dykes
  Ronnie Eriksson
  Max Evans (1 World Cup – 2011)
  Frank Fasson
  James Pringle Fisher
  Charles Fleming
  Iain Fullarton
  David Gilbert-Smith
   Colin Gilray
  Phil Godman
  Fraser Gore
  Donald Grant
  John Hart
  Gavin Hastings (3 World Cups – 1987, 1991, 1995)
  Sandy Hinshelwood
  Simon Holmes
  William Holms
   Doug Keller
  Ian Kilgour
  Walter Kerr
  Iain Laughland
  Alan Lawson
  Derrick Lee
  Kenny Logan (3 World Cups 95, 99, 03)
  Gregor MacGregor
  Andrew MacKinnon
  Bill Maclagan 1st British Lion Captain 1891 (South Africa)
  David MacMyn
  John Marshall
  Alastair McHarg – one of the many stalwarts of the club
  Ernie Michie
  Iain Morrison (1 World Cup – 1995)
  Hugh Monteith
  Hugh Orr
  Douglas Schulze
  Jim Shackleton
  Ian Smith Joint-record Scotland try scorer with 24 tries
  Arthur Smith
  Ken Spence
  Ronald Stevenson
  Ian Swan
  Malcolm Swan
  Frans ten Bos
  David Thom
  Bruce Thomson
  Rob Wainwright (1 World Cup – 1995)
  Leonard West
  Derek White (1 World Cup – 1991)
  Robert Whitworth
  Ron Wilson

Wales internationalists

The following former London Scottish players have represented Wales at full international level.

  Tomas Francis

England internationalists

The following former London Scottish players have represented England at full international level.

  Elliot Daly

Ireland internationalists

The following former London Scottish players have represented Ireland at full international level.

  Kieran Treadwell

Other nationalities

   John Allan
  Kyle Baillie
   Colin Gilray
  David Halaifonua
  George Hunter
  Paul Lasike
  Will Magie
  Rusty Page
  Dave Sisi
  Nodar Tcheishvili
  Mike Te'o
  Andrew Turner
  Tjiuee Uanivi
  Dino Waldren

See also
 Rugby union in London
 London Irish RFC
 London Welsh RFC
 Middlesex Sevens

References

External links
Official site
Exiles earn promotion in England, The Scotsman, 16 April 2007

Bibliography
 Bath, Richard (ed.) The Complete Book of Rugby (Seven Oaks Ltd, 1997 )
 Bath, Richard (ed.) The Scotland Rugby Miscellany (Vision Sports Publishing Ltd, 2007 )
 Godwin, Terry Complete Who's Who of International Rugby (Cassell, 1987)
 Massie, Allan A Portrait of Scottish Rugby (Polygon, Edinburgh)

 
Premiership Rugby teams
Rugby clubs established in 1878
English rugby union teams
Scottish rugby union teams
Scottish diaspora in Europe
Rugby union clubs in London
Sport in the London Borough of Richmond upon Thames
Diaspora sports clubs in the United Kingdom